Alfred Lalruotsang (born 26 June 2003) is an Indian professional footballer who plays as a forward for Indian Super League club NorthEast United FC. He is the youngest-ever player to play in the Indian Super League at the age of 16 years and 240 days.

Club career

NorthEast United
Lalroutsang made his debut for NorthEast United in February 2020 after multiple injuries to the starting squad, becoming the youngest-ever player to play in the ISL at the age of 16 years.
In 2022 Durand Cup, Alfred plays 4 games for NorthEast United B and provided one assist in the end of the tournament. Due to his impressive performance Alfred is promoted to the senior team for 2022–23 Indian Super League season.

Career statistics

Honours

NorthEast United B
GSA C Division: 2022

References

External links 
 

2003 births
Indian footballers
Living people
Footballers from Assam
NorthEast United FC players
Association football midfielders